The Pyrgotidae are an unusual family of flies (Diptera), one of only two families of Cyclorrhapha that lack ocelli. Most species are "picture-winged" (i.e., have patterns of bands or spots on the wings), as is typical among the Tephritoidea, but unlike other tephritoids, they are endoparasitoids; the females pursue scarab beetles in flight, laying an egg on the beetle's back under the elytra where the beetle cannot reach it. The egg hatches and the fly larva enters the body cavity of the beetle, feeding and eventually killing the host before pupating. In the United States, some species of Pyrgota and Sphecomyiella can be quite common in areas where their host beetles (typically the genus Phyllophaga, or "June beetles") are abundant. Like their host beetles, these flies are primarily nocturnal, and are often attracted to artificial lights.

Genera

Acropyrgota Hendel, 1914
Adapsilia Waga, 1842
Adapsona Paramonov, 1958
Afropyrgota V. Korneyev, 2015
Austromyia Hardy, 1954
Boreothrinax Steyskal, 1978
Campylocera Macquart, 1843
Cardiacera Macquart, 1847
Carrerapyrgota Aczél, 1956
Clemaxia Enderlein, 1942
Commoniella Paramonov, 1958
Descoleia Aczel, 1956
Diasteneura Hendel, 1908
Epice Paramonov, 1958
Eumorphomyia Hendel, 1907
Eupyrgota Coquillett, 1898 (Synonyms: Apyrgota Hendel, 1909; Taeniomastix Enderlein, 1942)
Facilina Paramonov, 1958
Frontalia Malloch, 1929
Geloemyia Hendel, 1908
Hendelpyrgota Vanschuytbroeck, 1963
Hypotyphla Loew, 1873
Leptopyrgota Hendel, 1914
Lopadops Enderlein, 1942
Lygiohypotyphla Enderlein, 1942
Maenomenus Bezzi, 1929
Metropina Enderlein, 1942
Neopyrgota Hendel, 1934
Neotoxura Malloch, 1929
Parageloemyia Hendel, 1934
Platynostira Enderlein, 1942
Plectrobrachis Enderlein, 1942
Porpomastix Enderlein, 1942
Prodalmannia Bezzi, 1929
Prohypotyphla Hendel, 1934
Pyrgota Wiedemann, 1830
Pyrgotella Curran, 1934
Pyrgotina Malloch, 1929
Pyrgotomyia Hendel, 1934
Pyrgotosoma Malloch, 1933
Siridapha Enderlein, 1942
Stirothrinax Enderlein, 1942
Tephritohypotyphla Vanschuytbroeck, 1963
Tephritopyrgota Hendel, 1914
Toxopyrgota Hendel, 1914
Toxura Macquart, 1851
Trichempodia Malloch, 1930
Tropidothrinax Enderlein, 1942
Tylotrypes Bezzi, 1914

References

External links

 
Tephritoidea
Brachycera families
Diptera of Africa
Diptera of Asia
Diptera of Australasia
Diptera of North America
Taxa named by Hermann Loew